Vtorov (masculine) or Vtorova (feminine) is a Russian surname. It is derived from the sobriquet второй (vtoroy, meaning "Second") and may refer to:

 Aleksandr Vtorov (1916-?) Soviet equestrian
 Nikolay Vtorov (1866–1918), Russian industrialist
 Pyotr Vtorov (1938-1979), Soviet scientist 

Russian-language surnames